Withrow v. Williams, 507 U.S. 680 (1993), was a United States Supreme Court case in which the Court held that Fifth Amendment Miranda v. Arizona arguments can be raised again in federal habeas corpus proceedings, even if a criminal defendant had a fair chance to argue those claims in state court. The Court rejected the state's argument that Stone v. Powell, a case holding the opposite in the context of Fourth Amendment claims on habeas review, applied in Williams' case.

See also
 List of United States Supreme Court cases
 Lists of United States Supreme Court cases by volume
 List of United States Supreme Court cases by the Rehnquist Court

References

External links

United States Supreme Court cases
United States Supreme Court cases of the Rehnquist Court
1993 in United States case law
United States habeas corpus case law
Miranda warning case law